Cycloheptane is a cycloalkane with the molecular formula C7H14. Cycloheptane is used as a nonpolar solvent for the chemical industry and as an intermediate in the manufacture of chemicals and pharmaceutical drugs. It may be derived by Clemmensen reduction from cycloheptanone. Cycloheptane vapour is irritating to the eyes and may cause respiratory depression if inhaled in large quantity.

Conformations
Cycloheptane is not a flat molecule, because that would give C-C-C bond angles much greater than the tetrahedral angle of around 109.5°. Instead it is puckered and three-dimensional. One can ask the question of what conformations would have the same angle everywhere (near 109.5°) and all bond lengths equal. If we think of an open chain of seven bonds, there are five dihedral angles that can be chosen, for the sequences (1,2,3,4), (2,3,4,5), and so on. The last bond though should end where the first began, and should form the correct angle with the first bond. This imposes four constraints, but we have five dihedral angles to play with, so there is one degree of freedom. It turns out that there are two continua of solutions. One is a circular series of fourteen "boat" conformations interspersed with "twist-boat" conformations, and the other is a circular series of fourteen "chair" conformations interspersed with "twist-chair" conformations. The boat and chair conformations have mirror symmetry, while the twist-boat and twist-chair have two-fold rotational symmetry. Conformations between boat and twist-boat or between chair and twist-chair have no symmetry. The passage along the continuum boat→twist-boat→boat→twist-boat→boat constitutes a pseudorotation, as does chair→twist-chair→chair→twist-chair→chair.

Actually in cycloheptane the conformations will not have exactly equal bond angles and lengths everywhere, because they do not have a seven-fold rotation or improper rotation. This contrasts with the chair form of cyclohexane in which all the bond angles and lengths are equal due to symmetry.

Below are depicted the boat and chair conformations.

References

Cycloalkanes
Hydrocarbon solvents
Seven-membered rings